Beton may refer to:

 Beton, a type of concrete
 Beton (typeface)
 Beton, a Czech drink containing Becherovka and tonic
 Jean-Claude Beton (1925–2013), Algerian-French businessman
 Concrete (novel) (original name Beton), a 1982 novel by Berthod

See also 
 Bethon, a commune in northeastern France
 Béthon, a commune in northwestern France
 Beton-Bazoches, a commune in France
 Marchais-Beton, a former commune in France
 Béton brut, architectural surface made of concrete
 Baton (disambiguation)